The  is a railway line operated by the East Japan Railway Company (JR East). It links Tsurumi Station in Yokohama with Nishi-Funabashi Station in Chiba Prefecture, forming a  unclosed loop around central Tokyo. The line forms part of what JR East refers to as the "Tokyo Mega Loop" around Tokyo, consisting of the Keiyō Line, Musashino Line, Nambu Line, and Yokohama Line.

Services
Most services on the Musashino Line are local trains making all stops.

Other services include:
Musashino: services operated between Fuchūhommachi/Hachiōji and 

Station list
Tsurumi Station is considered to be the origin of the Musashino Line; trains going clockwise (toward Nishi-Funabashi) are therefore referred to as heading , while trains going counter-clockwise (toward Fuchūhommachi) are heading . This is often counterintuitive, as it results in through trains to Tokyo being labeled and numbered as "down" trains while on the Musashino Line; however, such trains switch to "up" after joining the Keiyō Line.

All eastbound (for Nishi-Funabashi) passenger trains begin service at Fuchū-Hommachi Station. For details on the Musashino South Line and other branch lines, which are freight-only sections, can be found below the passenger station list.

Musashino Line (passenger) 

Ōmekaidō Station is approximately 10 minutes walk from Shin-Kodaira Station.

Musashino Freight Branch Lines

Rolling stock
 209-500 series eight-car EMUs (since December 2010)
 E231-0 series eight-car EMUs (since November 2017)
 E231-900 series eight-car EMU (since 20 July 2020)

Three 209-500 series sets were transferred from the Keiyō Line in 2010-2011, where they were displaced by new E233-5000 series sets and reduced from ten to eight cars per set; eight additional sets were transferred from the Chūō–Sōbu Line in 2018-2019. Between 2017 and 2020, E231-0 series sets were transferred from the Chūō–Sōbu Line and the Jōban Line and reduced from ten to eight cars per set to replace the 205 series. In July 2020, the sole E231-900 series set was also transferred from the Chūō–Sōbu Line and reduced from ten to eight cars.

Former
 101-1000 series 6-car EMUs (1 April 1973 - 26 October 1986)
 103 series 6-car, later 8-car EMUs (June 1980 - 8 December 2005)
 201 series 6-car EMUs (from 3 March 1986 - November 1996)
 205-0 series 8-car EMUs (from December 1991 - October 2019)
 205-5000 series 8-car EMUs (from 2002 - 19 October 2020)

165 and 169 series EMUs were used on Shinkansen Relay services and later Musashino rapid services until 2002. 115 series EMUs were used on Musashino services from 2002 until the services were downgraded to all-stations "Local" status in December 2010. The 205-0 series sets were built from new for the Musashino Line, entering service from 1 December 1991, and have six motored cars per eight-car set. These were the last 205 series sets to be built from new. The 205-5000 series sets were modified between 2002 and 2008 from displaced former Yamanote Line sets by adding new VVVF-controlled AC motors, and have four motored cars per eight-car set.

Freight
Locomotive types seen hauling freight trains include the Class EF64, Class EF65, Class EF66, Class EF81, Class EF200, Class EF210, Class EH200, Class EH500, Class DE10, and Class HD300.

History
The Musashino Line was initially envisioned as a "Tokyo Outer Loop Line" in a 1927 railway appropriations bill, but was not built for several decades due to World War II and its aftermath. Construction finally began in November 1965.

In 1967, a train carrying jet fuel to Tachikawa Air Base in western Tokyo exploded while passing through Shinjuku Station. This disaster led to the banning of freight trains on railway lines in central Tokyo and sped the development of the Musashino Line as an alternative route. Because most of the line passed through sparsely populated areas, it was initially envisioned as a freight-only line. However, opposition from local residents, at the same time as the violent landowner battles plaguing Narita International Airport, led the railway authorities to agree to passenger service as well.

Services operated at 15-minute intervals in the morning peak, and at 40-minute intervals during the daytime off-peak.

The southern freight-only line from Fuchū-Hommachi to Tsurumi opened on 1 March 1976. The eastern section of the line from Shin-Matsudo to  opened on 2 October 1978.

Inter-running to and from the Keiyo Line commenced on 1 December 1988.

From the start of the 1 December 1996 timetable revision, all of the Musashino Line 103 series sets were lengthened from six to eight cars.

On 20 August 2016, station numbering was introduced with stations on the Musashino line being assigned station numbers between JM10 and JM35. Numbers increase in the counter-clockwise direction towards Fuchu-Hommachi.

See also

Osaka Higashi Line, envisioned as a counterpart in the Osaka area
Aichi Loop Line, counterpart around Nagoya

References

External links

 Stations of the Musashino Line (JR East) 

 
Lines of East Japan Railway Company
Railway lines in Kanagawa Prefecture
Railway lines in Tokyo
Rail transport in Saitama Prefecture
Railway lines in Chiba Prefecture
1067 mm gauge railways in Japan
Railway lines opened in 1973
1973 establishments in Japan